NBA assists leader may refer to:
List of National Basketball Association annual assists leaders
List of National Basketball Association career assists leaders
List of National Basketball Association career playoff assists leaders
List of National Basketball Association single-game assists leaders

Assist (basketball)